Luc Beyens (born 27 March 1959) is a Belgian footballer. He played in two matches for the Belgium national football team in 1987.

References

External links
 

1959 births
Living people
Belgian footballers
Belgium international footballers
Place of birth missing (living people)
Association football midfielders
K.F.C. Lommel S.K. players
KFC Turnhout players
R.A.A. Louviéroise players
K.S.K. Tongeren players
Club Brugge KV players
K.R.C. Genk players
K.F.C. Verbroedering Geel players
Belgian football managers
Lommel S.K. managers